Chileomma is a genus of Chilean long-spinneret ground spiders that was first described by Norman I. Platnick, M. U. Shadab & L. N. Sorkin in 2005.

Species
 it contains seven species, found only in Chile:
Chileomma campana Platnick, Shadab & Sorkin, 2005 – Chile
Chileomma chilensis Platnick, Shadab & Sorkin, 2005 – Chile
Chileomma franckei Platnick, Shadab & Sorkin, 2005 – Chile
Chileomma malleco Platnick, Shadab & Sorkin, 2005 – Chile
Chileomma petorca Platnick, Shadab & Sorkin, 2005 – Chile
Chileomma rinconada Platnick, Shadab & Sorkin, 2005 – Chile
Chileomma ruiles Platnick, Shadab & Sorkin, 2005 (type) – Chile

See also
 List of Gnaphosidae species

References

Araneomorphae genera
Gnaphosidae
Spiders of South America
Endemic fauna of Chile